The Play-offs of the 2005 Fed Cup Europe/Africa Zone Group I were the final stages of the Group I Zonal Competition involving teams from Europe and Africa. Using the positions determined in their pools, the sixteen teams faced off to determine their placing in the 2005 Fed Cup Europe/Africa Zone Group I. The top two teams advanced to World Group II play-offs, and the bottom two teams were relegated down to the Europe/Africa Zone Group II for the next year.

Promotion play-offs
The first placed teams of each pool were placed against each other in two head-to-head rounds. The winner of the rounds advanced to the World Group II play-offs, where they would get a chance to advance to the World Group II for next year.

Bulgaria vs. Netherlands

Slovenia vs. Belarus

Fifth to Seventh play-off
The second placed teams of each pool were placed against each other in two ties. The winner of each tie was allocated fifth place in the Group while the losers were allocated seventh.

South Africa vs. Sweden

Serbia and Montenegro vs. Israel

Ninth and Eleventh play-off
The third placed teams of each pool were placed against each other in two ties. The winner of each tie was allocated ninth place in the Group while the losers were allocated eleventh.

Hungary vs. Luxembourg

Great Britain vs. Ukraine

Relegation play-offs
The last placed teams of each pool were placed against each other in two ties. The losing team of the rounds were relegated to Group II for next year.

Estonia vs. Poland

Denmark vs. Greece

Final Placements

  and  advanced to the World Group II Play-offs. The Bulgarians were drawn against , and they lost 1–4. The Slovenians were drawn against , and they also lost 1–4. Both teams thus fell back to Group I for the next year.
The Polish placed first overall, thus achieving advancement back to Group I for 2006, while the Greeks placed fifth.

See also
Fed Cup structure

References

External links
 Fed Cup website

2005 Fed Cup Europe/Africa Zone